Verkhnemamonsky District is an administrative and municipal district (raion), one of the thirty-two in Voronezh Oblast, Russia. It is located in the south of the oblast. Its administrative center is the rural locality (a selo) of Verkhny Mamon. Population:  The population of Verkhny Mamon accounts for 40.3% of the district's total population.

References

Notes

Sources

Districts of Voronezh Oblast